The 2015 Pan American Men's Junior Handball Championship took place in Foz do Iguaçu from 24–28 March. It acts as the Pan American qualifying tournament for the 2015 Men's Junior World Handball Championship.

Results

Round robin

Final standing

References

External links
 
 

2015 in handball
Pan American Men's Junior Handball Championship
Junior
2015 in Brazilian sport